Alsunde is a village in the Karmala taluka of Solapur district in Maharashtra state, India.

Demographics
Covering  and comprising 237 households at the time of the 2011 census of India, Alsunde had a population of 1102. There were 586 males and 516 females, with 132 people being aged six or younger.

References

Villages in Karmala taluka